Uzbekistan competed at the 2015 World Aquatics Championships in Kazan, Russia from 24 July to 9 August 2015.

Diving

Uzbek divers qualified for the individual spots at the World Championships.

Men

Swimming

Uzbek swimmers have achieved qualifying standards in the following events (up to a maximum of 2 swimmers in each event at the A-standard entry time, and 1 at the B-standard):

Men

Women

Synchronized swimming

Uzbekistan has qualified two synchronized swimmers to compete in each of the following events.

References

External links
Kazan 2015 Official Site

Nations at the 2015 World Aquatics Championships
2015 in Uzbekistani sport
Uzbekistan at the World Aquatics Championships